Teretia multicingula is an extinct species of sea snail, a marine gastropod mollusk in the family Raphitomidae.

Description
The length of the shell attains 15 mm, its diameter 6 mm.

(Original description in Italian) This is also a species close to Teretia anceps from which it differs by the shape and the course of the cinguli, which are very numerous, not very prominent, and very close so that the interstices become minimal. The convex whorls have deep sutures.

Distribution
Fossils of this marine species were found in Pliocene strata in Calabria, Italy

References

 Brunetti, M.; Vecchi, G. (2003). Sul ritrovamento di Teretia elengatissima (Foresti, 1868) in terreni pliocenici dell'Emilia e della Toscana. Bollettino della Società Paleontologica Italiana. 42: 49-57

External links
 Morassi M. & Bonfitto A. (2015). New Indo-Pacific species of the genus Teretia Norman, 1888 (Gastropoda: Raphitomidae). Zootaxa. 3911(4): 560-570 
 

multicingula
Gastropods described in 1880